The white-breasted thrasher (Ramphocinclus brachyurus), also known as goj blan in Creole, is a species of bird in the family Mimidae. Semper and Sclater (1872) describe the white-breasted thrasher as an "inquisitive and noisy bird" that would often "keep up a constant warning chatter, and throw itself about in all sorts of contortions" when being disturbed. It is endemic to Martinique and Saint Lucia, found only on these two islands of the Lesser Antilles. This resident species is easy to find within its range; however, it is classified as endangered by the IUCN Red List of Threatened Species mainly due to its restricted habitat.

Description 
The white-breasted thrasher is in average 23 to 25 cm long, and weight from 48 to 60 g depending on sex and subspecies. An adult bird has a dark brown plumage with a white throat, breast, and belly. Its dark beak is long and slightly decurved towards the tip. Several dark bristles are located around the lores, between the red eyes and nostrils of the bird. This medium-sized passerine has long and strong black legs and can live up to 7–8 years. Males and females are sexually monomorphic, thus identical in size and coloration. This bird is difficulty sexed by hand or sight due to sexual monomorphism. Males and females have the same plumage and only breeding females can be identified during breading season by their brood patch.

The plumage of an immature white-breasted thrasher is uniformly brown, with a brown throat and a greyish belly. The white patch on its breast will develop with age, around a month later. When the bird is in its first year, it can be differentiated to an adult bird by the rusty brown colour of its upper-parts, and its brownish eye color.

Taxonomy 
The white-breasted thrasher belongs to a monophyletic group and is the only member of genus Ramphocinclus.

There are two known subspecies of white-breasted thrasher:
 Ramphocinclus brachyurus brachyurus,
 Ramphocinclus brachyurus sanctaeluciae
Until now, the two subspecies are each restricted to their own habitat location, but they can also be differentiated by their size and coloration. Indeed, R. b. sanctaeluciae is larger, darker, and show a greater sexual dimorphism than R. b. brachyurus.

Habitat and Distribution

Distribution 
Because the white-breasted thrasher is endemic to two islands of the Lesser Antilles, its range is dangerously small for species survival.
 The nominal subspecies, R. b. brachyurus, is only found in Martinique, where its habitat is restricted to a 5 km^2, now protected, area called the Caravelle Peninsula.
 Whereas R. b. sanctaeluciae inhabits Saint Lucia, which is south of Martinique. Two different populations of this subspecies are distinguished by habitat location on the island: a northern population located in Iyanola municipality and a southern one in Mandelé municipality.
There is no evidence of white-breasted thrasher movement between the two islands.

Habitat 
The white-breasted thrasher prefers deciduous tropical dry forests and shrub lands, although the northern population of R. b. sanctaeluciae lives along ravines and river-valleys.

The semi wooded habitats carefully selected by this habitat specialist must be located within 2 km of the coast, and up to 200 m above sea level. Low canopy shrubs and clear spaces are avoided by both subspecies because of predation, especially during breeding. Soils with an abundant leaf-litter are also favoured for feeding.

Behaviour

Diet 
The white-breasted thrasher's diet is adaptable and goes from animal proteins to fruits. Feeding habits depend on what's available to the bird according to environmental conditions. White-breasted thrashers are ground eaters. They forage mainly on leaf litter fauna, looking for insects or berries. They also have the ability to regurgitate a whole berry and spit out seeds to save it for a later meal.

Predators 
Because white-breasted thrashers are ground eating birds, they are mostly vulnerable to small mammals attacks, but they are also often victim of egg predation. The predator list differ for each subspecies, as the two islands don't have the same fauna and introduced species. R.b.sanctaeluciae predators are the boa constrictor (Constrictor orophias), the common opossum (Didelphis marsupialis), and the broad-wing hawk (Buteo platypterus) whereas R.b.brachyrus predators are rats (Rattus rattus), the introduced small Asian mongooses (Herpestes javanicus), and cats (Felis silverstris catus).

Vocalization 
Vocalization repertoire of the white-breasted thrasher is limited which is surprising for a species that belongs to Mimids. The white-breasted thrashers often vocalize short and harsh calls, and sometimes a musical "tee-rou". Alarm calls are harsh "tschh" on Saint Lucia, and "grok grok" on Martinique. They are used between birds to warn each other when athreat is perceived. Juveniles are located by thin "tseep" calls.

Reproduction 
The white-breasted thrasher's breeding season starts mid-April and lasts until the end of September. A breeding bird can have up to four successive broods in one breeding season and the average clutch size varies from 1 to 3 eggs. Birds usually live in pair and build voluminous nests in high trees from 1.5 to 5 m above the ground. Before using a nest, a pari of bird usually build several of them. Each individual takes turn in nest building tasks. For instance, each bird sit in the nest, in turns, to adjust the inside part of it. White-breasted thrashers are thus called cooperative breeders.

Because of egg predation, nesting failure is relatively high and white-breasted thrashers came with an anti-predatory strategy that consists of keeping their nests clean of eggshells and fecal sacs to reduce nest detection.

Conservation Status 
The white-breasted thrasher total population is estimated at 1900 individuals and is ranked as "endangered" according to the IUCN Red List. The rate of decline of the population has largely increased due to habitat loss on both islands.  The white-breasted thrasher is able to coexist with some of its predators such as rats and mongooses. However, this predation places an additional burden on the already small thrasher population, especially in Martinique where rats and mongooses are more abundant. That is why organizations charged with environmental protection have started several programs such as: rats extermination and mongoose capture program, and also a program aimed at monitoring the reproduction success of the R. b. brachyurus (in which one of the tasks consists of fixing plastic bottles on nesting trees trunks, preventing predators to reach the nest).

References

External links 
 Les hot-spots du Moqueur gorge-blanche en Martinique.
 White-breasted thrasher sound.

white-breasted thrasher
Birds of Martinique
Birds of Saint Lucia
Endemic birds of the Caribbean
Higher-level bird taxa restricted to the West Indies
white-breasted thrasher
Taxa named by Louis Jean Pierre Vieillot
Taxonomy articles created by Polbot